Loving the Alien (1983–1988) is a box set by English singer-songwriter David Bowie, released on 12 October 2018. A follow-up to the compilations Five Years (1969–1973), Who Can I Be Now? (1974–1976), and A New Career in a New Town (1977–1982), the set covers the period of Bowie's career from 1983 to 1988, his most commercially successful period, and includes eleven compact discs or fifteen LPs.

Exclusive to the box set are Never Let Me Down 2018, a re-engineered version of his 1987 album, and Dance, an alternate 2018 version of a previously planned but scrapped 12" collection. Initially exclusive to this box set, but released separately later, are live albums from his Serious Moonlight and Glass Spider tours from 1983 and 1987, respectively. The Serious Moonlight live album was the first official audio release from the tour, using the same setlist and audio as the Serious Moonlight concert film (save for the addition of a live performance of "Modern Love", recorded in Montreal and originally released as the B-side to the song's studio recording), while the Glass Spider live album had been previously included with the 2007 DVD release of the Glass Spider concert film.

The box set includes remastered editions of Let's Dance (1983), Tonight (1984) and Never Let Me Down (1987). It also includes Re:Call 4, a compilation of non-album singles, single versions, and B-sides from his albums and soundtrack releases for Labyrinth, Absolute Beginners and When the Wind Blows, all from 1986.

The set comes with a hardcover book with rarely seen and previously unpublished photos by photographers including Denis O'Regan, Greg Gorman, Herb Ritts and many others as well as historical press reviews and technical notes about the albums from producers/engineers Nile Rodgers, Hugh Padgham, Mario McNulty and Justin Shirley-Smith.

The remix compilation Dance was originally scheduled to be released by EMI in 1985. The concept of the album, however, was vastly different from the version that appears in this box set. Seven tracks from the era were to have new additional production and mixing by Paul Sabu and Rusty Garner. This idea was later scrapped, but the album cover had already been shot and some physical copies of the sleeve they had made began circulating outside of the label before they were destroyed in bulk. The version of Dance that appears in Loving the Alien (1983–1988) is simply a collection of the original 12" remixes from the era, sans most dub mixes. This release of Dance uses the same album art that was shot for the original concept in 1985.

A follow-up set, Brilliant Adventure (1992–2001), was announced in September 2021 and set for release later that fall; the announcement came following Warner Music Group's acquisition of the material Bowie released under Columbia Records between 2002 and 2017.

Track listing

Let's Dance (2018 remaster)

Serious Moonlight (Live '83)

Tonight (2018 remaster)

Never Let Me Down (2018 remaster)

Never Let Me Down 2018

Glass Spider (Live Montreal '87)

Dance

Re:Call 4 (remastered tracks)

Charts

References

David Bowie compilation albums
2018 compilation albums
Parlophone compilation albums